Metasphenisca reinhardi is a species of tephritid or fruit flies in the genus Metasphenisca of the family Tephritidae.

Distribution
Pakistan, India, Sri Lanka, Myanmar, Cambodia.

References

Tephritinae
Insects described in 1824
Diptera of Asia